Mountjoy is an unincorporated community in Logan County, Illinois, United States. Mountjoy is northwest of Atlanta.

References

Unincorporated communities in Logan County, Illinois
Unincorporated communities in Illinois